Scullin is a residential suburb in the Belconnen district of Canberra, located within the Australian Capital Territory, Australia. The suburb is named after Prime Minister of Australia James Scullin. It was gazetted on 6 June 1968.  In the city of Canberra, suburbs are assigned street names that reflect a distinct sub-group of cultural or historical Australian significance. The streets in the suburb of Scullin are named after aviators.  
Southern Cross Early Childhood School and Scullin neighbourhood oval are located within the suburb. It is bordered by Kingsford Smith Drive, Belconnen Way, Southern Cross Drive and Chewings Street. Scullin is approximately 20 minutes walk and 5 minutes by car from the Belconnen Town Centre and 15 minutes walk and 3 minutes by car from the Hawker Shopping Centre. It is approximately 10 to 15 minutes by car from Canberra City and 30 minutes from Canberra Airport.

Political representation 

For the purposes of Australian federal elections for the House of Representatives, Scullin is in the Division of Fenner.

For the purposes of Australian Capital Territory elections for the ACT Legislative Assembly, Scullin is in the Ginninderra electorate.

Geology

Rocks in Scullin are from the Silurian age. Green grey rhyodacite of the Walker Volcanics underlie the south and center of the suburb. North of center is purple and green-grey dacite of the Walker Volcanics that was deposited before the rhyodacite. A strip along the far north east has pink rhyolite from the Deakin Volcanics.  Purple pink rhyolite from the Deakin Volcanics is in the north west of the strip.

Education
Scullin residents get preference for:
Southern Cross Early Childhood School
A shared Priority Enrolment Area (PEA) of Florey Primary, Hawker Primary, and Weetangera Primary
Belconnen High School
Hawker College

References

Suburbs of Canberra